Hyllus nigeriensis is a species of jumping spider in the genus Hyllus that was first identified in Cross River State in Nigeria. It was first described in 2012. The species derives its name from the country where it was first identified.

References

Endemic fauna of Nigeria
Fauna of Nigeria
Salticidae
Spiders described in 2012
Spiders of Africa
Taxa named by Wanda Wesołowska